Genghis Grill is an interactive Mongolian Stir Fry fast casual restaurant. Customers choose their own proteins, vegetables, spices, sauces and side options from a Fresh Bar which includes over 80 ingredients. The customer then passes their selection to the Grill Master who places it on a huge round open grill. Genghis Grill has over 50 locations across the nation and offers a loyalty program, Genghis Rewards, for their frequent guests.

History 

Founded in 1998 by Dallas-based entrepreneur Jeff Sinelli, who also founded Which Wich?, the concept was bought in 2004 by The Chalak Group of Companies  who have expanded the company to over 70 locations in 19 states across the country, with plans to reach 100 locations by the end of 2011.

In 2010, Genghis Grill was ranked #3 in Fast Casual Top 100 Movers and Shakers, #5 in Restaurant Business’s Future 50, and listed in Entrepreneur Magazine’s Franchise 500. Genghis Grill was ranked #812 in Inc. Magazine's 5000.
Genghis Grill was ranked in Top 25 Restaurants in Social Media by the Restaurant Social Media Index. In 2011, Genghis Grill’s CEO, Al Bhakta, was ranked in Nation’s Restaurant News Top 10 CEO’s to watch. In 2017 Genghis Grill acquired bd's Mongolian Grill and Flat Top Grill forming Mongolian Concepts. Mongolian Concepts, led by CEO Jim Vinz, is based in Irving, Texas.

References 

Fast casual restaurants
Companies based in Dallas
Restaurants established in 1998
American companies established in 1998
1998 establishments in Texas